Katherine Walker was an American lighthouse keeper.

Katherine Walker may also refer to:
Kathryn Walker, American actress
Catherine Walker (actor) (born 1975), Irish actor
Catherine Walker (fashion designer) (1945–2010), London-based French fashion designer

See also
Kate Walker (disambiguation) for those known as Kate or Katie